United Nations Security Council Resolution 331, adopted on April 20, 1973, requested the Secretary-General to submit a report to the Council detailing the efforts undertaken by the UN pertaining to the Middle East since June 1967 and decided to meet following the submission of the report to examine the situation.  The Council also requested the Secretary-General invite Mr. Gunnar Jarring, the Special Representative of the Secretary-General, to be available during the meeting in order to render assistance to the course of the deliberations.

The President of the Council stated that in the absence of any objections, the resolution was adopted unanimously.

See also
 List of United Nations Security Council Resolutions 301 to 400 (1971–1976)

References 
Text of the Resolution at undocs.org

External links
 

 0331
Middle East peace efforts
April 1973 events